Witches Abroad is the twelfth Discworld novel by Terry Pratchett, originally published in 1991.

Plot
Following the death of the witch Desiderata Hollow, Magrat Garlick receives Desiderata's magic wand, for Desiderata was not only a witch but also a fairy godmother. By giving the wand to Magrat, she effectively makes Magrat the new fairy godmother to a young woman called Emberella, who lives across the Disc in Genua. Sadly, Desiderata does not give Magrat any instruction on how to use the wand, so pretty much anything that Magrat points it at simply becomes a pumpkin.

Desiderata had promised Emberella that she would not be forced to marry the Duke (or Duc, as it is spelled in the book), who's really a frog/prince. Now it is up to Magrat and her companions, (Granny Weatherwax and Nanny Ogg), to ensure Emberella does not marry the Duc, despite the desires of another witch in Genua called Lilith, Desiderata's fairy godmother counterpart. Lilith used the power of mirrors to capture Genua.

The trio of witches journey to Genua, which takes some time and involves numerous mis-adventures, such as an encounter with a village terrorised by a Vampire—Nanny Ogg's cat Greebo catches it in bat form and eats it—an incident where they encounter a Running of the Bulls-like event, and a house falling on Nanny's head which she survives thanks to her hat with the willow reinforcement. Upon arrival in Genua, Magrat goes to meet Emberella, while the two older witches meet Erzulie Gogol, a voodoo witch and her zombie servant, Baron Saturday (who was also her late lover).

It is at this time that Magrat finds out that Emberella has two fairy godmothers, Magrat and Lilith. It was Lilith who had manipulated many of the various stories that the Witches had traveled through and who was now manipulating Genua itself, wrapping the city around her version of the Cinderella story. Lilith has had people arrested for crimes against stories, including the arrest of a toymaker for not being jolly, not whistling and not telling the children stories. At this point it is revealed that Lilith is actually Lily, Granny Weatherwax's older sister.

Using hypnosis, Granny convinces Magrat to attend the masked ball in place of Emberella. Greebo is transformed into human form to aid the witches. Emberella's dress fits, but the glass slippers do not. After enjoying themselves for a while at the ball, the witches are discovered and are cast into a dungeon.

At that point, Emberella, Mrs. Gogol and Baron Saturday arrive at the ball, having broken the witches out of their prison with the aid of Cassanunda (a dwarf and the Disc's second greatest lover). A high concentration of magic causes the Duc to revert to his frog form, and he is trampled by Baron Saturday, causing Lily to flee. Granny starts to follow, but Mrs. Gogol, wanting to kill Lily, tries to stop Granny by using a voodoo doll. Granny thrusts her arm into a flaming torch and preys upon Mrs. Gogol's own belief in the power of the doll to make it burst into flames. Granny Weatherwax then pursues Lily.

Emberella is informed that, as the daughter of the late Baron Saturday, the previous ruler of Genua, she is now Duchess of Genua. Her first command is to end the ball (she dislikes them) and attend the Mardi Gras parade, a form of binge-drinking carnival.

Granny manages to defeat Lily by trapping her in a mirror, unable to 'find herself', and the three witches return home. Granny shows Magrat how to use the wand to do magic, and that it takes more than wishing. Magrat throws the wand into a river, to be lost forever. Then the Witches go home, the long way, and see the elephant.

Characters

Esme Weatherwax
Nanny Ogg
Magrat Garlick
Greebo
Lily aka Lilith de Tempscire
Emberella
Mrs Pleasant
Erzulie Gogol
Baron Saturday

Themes
 Fairy tales
 Fairy godmothers
 Cinderella
 Little Red Riding Hood
 The Wizard of Oz
 New Orleans
 Carnival / Mardi Gras
 Swamps
 Voodoo

See also
The Frog Princess

References

External links

 
Annotations for Witches Abroad
Quotes from Witches Abroad
Synopsis for Witches Abroad

1991 British novels
Discworld books
1991 fantasy novels
Victor Gollancz Ltd books
British comedy novels